Abraham Zinger (1864, Kapulye – 1920, Babroysk) was a Russian-Jewish author, feuilletonist, and translator.

Biography
Zinger was born in Kapulye, Minsk Governorate. Orphaned at the age of 10, he studied at Minsk, Slutsk, Pinsk, Nesvizh, and Mir, meanwhile encountering Haskalah literature.

He worked as a Hebrew teacher in Warsaw from 1888, but fled to his hometown during the Russian withdrawal from Poland in 1915. Amid the pogroms following Operation Minsk, he attempted in 1920 to return to Warsaw, but contracted typhus on the way there. He succumbed to the disease in Bobruisk.

Work
As a literary critic, he reviewed the Hebrew poetry of I. L. Peretz, among other writers.

Under the title Ohel Tom, he published in 1896 a Hebrew translation of Harriet Beecher Stowe's Uncle Tom's Cabin; or, Life Among the Lowly. David Ben-Gurion would later cite Zinger's translation as influential on his ideological development.

Partial bibliography

References

External links
 Avraham Zinger at the 
 

1864 births
1920 deaths
19th-century Jews
20th-century Jews
Deaths from typhus
English–Hebrew translators
Short story writers from the Russian Empire
Jewish writers from the Russian Empire
Literary critics from the Russian Empire
Translators from the Russian Empire
Novelists from the Russian Empire
People from Kapyl
Uncle Tom's Cabin
Belarusian Jews